Vladimír Svozil (born 20 November 1966) is a Czech painter.

Life 
Svozil's artistic career began at the turn of the millennium. He Svozil lives and works in Pisek, a South Bohemian town. In 2011 he participated on founding Prácheňská umělecká beseda (PUB, the Artistic association of Prachen) which associates artists and friends of art who are somehow related with Pisek.

Art 
Svozil paints mainly with acrylics by applying several layers of paint. Sometimes he uses a combination of different painting techniques, for example acrylic with line drawings, charcoal drawings, watercolor or collage. His favourite colors are blue and green.

His main themes are figural formation, still life and abstraction.

Exhibitions 

2011 – Gallery Portyč, Písek
2011 – The Mining Museum Pribram, (Hornické muzeum Příbram), Příbram
2012 – Gallery Portyč, Písek

Some of his works 
Pištec (The Piper)
Tři podoby smutku (Three Forms of Mourning)
Dívka s deštníkem (The Girl with Umbrella)
Vrak (The Wreck)

References

See also
Prácheňská umělecká beseda
List of Czech painters

External links 
Personal gallery

1966 births
Artists from Prague
Czech painters
Czech male painters
Living people